Bry-sur-Marne (literally Bry on Marne) is a commune in the Val-de-Marne department in the eastern suburbs of Paris, France.

The commune of Bry-sur-Marne is part of the sector of Porte de Paris, one of the four sectors of the "new town" of Marne-la-Vallée.

History

Prehistory and early history
Bry's name comes from the Celtic word Briw, which means a bridge or a river crossing. The area has been inhabited since Neolithic times. The town's motto, which features on its coat of arms, is "Moult viel que Paris" - old French for "Much older than Paris".

In 1903, archeologist Adrien Mentienne uncovered the bones of a large bovine which died 15,000 years ago. In 1982, the skeleton of a woman who died in the 5th century BC was uncovered beneath the playground of a school in Bry. It is now housed in the town's museum.

From that century onwards, there was a permanent human presence where Bry now stands. In 1886, a necropolis was found which contained pottery, Gaul and Frankish weaponry, silver and gold jewelry, and coins, dating from the Gaul era to the Merovingian. The first known written mention of the town named Bry was in a charter signed by King Charles the Bald in 861.

The first church was built in 1130.

From the feudal era to modern times
In 1404, Robert de Châtillon, cousin of King Charles VI, was Bry's feudal lord. His castle no longer stands, and its exact location is uncertain. Bry's current château was built in the 1690s. It became the town hall in 1866. It was rebuilt after the Franco-Prussian War of 1870.

The railway came to Bry in 1926, followed by the motorway (1970) and the RER (1977). The town's hospital was built in 1936.

Population

Education
The commune has one public preschool, Maternelle Jules Ferry; three combined public preschools and elementary schools, La Pépinière, Paul Barilliet, and Louis Daguerre; as well as one public elementary school, Henri Cahn. The commune has a public junior high school, Collège Henri Cahn.

The commune also has a private elementary through junior high school, Institut Saint Thomas de Villeneuve.

There are multiple public senior high schools in surrounding communes:
 Lycée Louis Armand (Nogent-sur-Marne)
 Lycée Hector Berlioz (Vincennes)
 Lycée Edouard Branly (Nogent-sur-Marne)
 Lycée Paul Doumer (Le Perreux-sur-Marne)
 Lycée Évariste Galois (Noisy-le-Grand)
 Lycée Pablo Picasso (Fontenay-sous-Bois)

Personalities
Photographer Louis Daguerre died in Bry-sur-Marne in 1851 and a monument marks his grave there.
Laurel Zuckerman, author
Hervé Bazin, author

Daguerre's diorama
Bry's most treasured artwork is a diorama painted by Louis Daguerre. The painting changes as each day wears on, mimicking daylight and night-time; the painted candlesticks light up at night. It is kept in the local church.

Transport
Bry-sur-Marne is served by Bry-sur-Marne station on Paris RER line A.

International relations
The town has been twinned with Sawbridgeworth in Hertfordshire, England and Moosburg an der Isar in Germany since 1973.

Organisations
The Institut national de l'audiovisuel has its headquarters in the commune.

See also

Communes of the Val-de-Marne department

References

External links

  Official town site
 Bry's Association Louis Daguerre
 Official Website of the Museum of Bry

Communes of Val-de-Marne
Porte de Paris